Oh Hyuk (Hangul: 오혁, stylised OHHYUK, born October 5, 1993) is a South Korean singer and musician best known as the lead vocalist, guitarist and principal songwriter of indie rock band Hyukoh.

Background 
Born in South Korea, Oh moved to China when he was five months old with his parents, who were both teachers. His family lived in Yanji, Shenyang, and settled in Beijing. As a result, he speaks Korean, Mandarin Chinese, and English.

In an effort to convince his parents to allow him to pursue music, Oh auditioned for South Korea's three biggest music agencies, S.M. Entertainment, YG Entertainment and JYP Entertainment during summer vacation when he was fifteen. Despite all three companies wanting to sign him, he declined their offers due to differences in musical style.

In 2012, Oh defied his parents' wishes for him to study in the States and moved to Seoul with no financial support to pursue music. He enrolled in art studies at Hongik University, but swiftly dropped out.

Career

Music

Hyukoh  
Oh originally created Hyukoh as a one-man band, but formed the current four-piece in 2014 under the same name with bassist Im Dong-geon, guitarist Lim Hyun-jae and drummer Lee In-woo. Oh had worked with Lee in the past, having been introduced through Lim, with whom he had attended high school. He met Im through a mutual acquaintance.

The band's first three EPs, 20 (2014), 22 (2015) and 24 (2018); and their first full-length studio album, 23 (2017), were named after the members' ages (all four were born in 1993). They broke with this naming convention in 2020 with the release of their fourth EP Through Love. 
Oh is credited as a principal songwriter on all their albums. 

While the band achieved success in the Korean indie music scene with the release of their EPs, they gained mainstream popularity after participating in the South Korean television program Infinite Challenge. Following the release of 23, the band embarked on their first world tour.

Solo Ventures

Collaborations 
Oh has collaborated with a variety of South Korean artists across multiple genres, including hip hop group Epik High, singer-songwriter IU, rapper-producer Code Kunst and indie singer Car, the garden. In 2015, Oh and producer Primary collaborated on a four-track EP titled Lucky You!. In January 2018, Oh ventured into the house and techno genre through a collaboration with indie artist Cifika, entitled "Momon" (몸마음).

Original Soundtrack 
In 2015, Oh released a cover of Lee Moon-se's "A Little Girl" (소녀) for the soundtrack of the South Korean drama series ''Reply 1988.

Fashion 
Oh's distinct and "nonconformist" fashion sensibility has set him apart from others in mainstream K-pop and granted him notoriety in the global fashion community. He has been featured in several fashion and lifestyle publications, including Vogue and Elle. After modeling for NikeLab in China in late 2016, he was also featured on the cover of the country's inaugural issue of Dazed magazine. He later became a campaign ambassador for Converse.

Oh's interest in fashion was influenced early on by punk, particularly skate punk, and the aesthetics of Japanese designers.

Discography

Single albums

Singles

Other charted songs

Features

References

1993 births
Living people
21st-century South Korean male singers